The 2018 Texas Attorney General election took place on November 6, 2018, to elect the Attorney General of Texas. Incumbent Republican Attorney General Ken Paxton ran for re-election. The Democratic Party nominated attorney Justin Nelson. 

Paxton was narrowly re-elected to a second term by a 3.56% margin of victory.

Republican primary

Candidates
Ken Paxton, incumbent Attorney General

Results

Democratic primary

Candidates
Justin Nelson, Susman Godfrey partner

Results

Libertarian convention

Nominated 

 Michael Ray Harris, attorney

General election

Endorsements

Polling

Results

See also
 Texas Attorney General
 2018 Texas elections

Notes

References

Attorney General
Texas
Texas Attorney General elections